Phaea tenuata is a species of beetle in the family Cerambycidae. It was described by Henry Walter Bates in 1872. It is known from Mexico.

References

tenuata
Beetles described in 1872